() is a weekly newspaper published by the German Communist Party.

History and profile
Unsere Zeit was established in Düsseldorf in 1969. It is the organ of the German Communist Party.

Its circulation was 60,000 copies in 1975. The weekly paper co-operates with the small German newspaper junge Welt.

Festival

The biannual UZ-Pressefest has been the largest festival of the political left in Germany. Since 1973, it has attracted hundreds of thousands of visitors and nationally famous musicians such as Konstantin Wecker and Hannes Wader.

References

External links

1969 establishments in West Germany
Unsere zeit
Mass media in Düsseldorf
Publications established in 1969
Unsere zeit